Ruddock  may refer to:

 European robin (Erithacus rubecula), the classic robin bird
 Ruddock House
 Ruddock, Louisiana
 Ruddock (surname)